Eugenia Bonetti is a nun who works to rescue girls from being trafficked in Italy and help women leave the country's prostitution industry.

Life
She is a Consolata Missionary Sister, a Master of Counselling, and a member of the Italian Union of Major Superiors, leading the organization's work against human trafficking. In this capacity, she is in charge of 250 nuns around the world who work to help young girls and women exit prostitution. 

She appears in the documentary film Not My Life, in which she speaks about her work in Italy. In 2005, she participated in a conference sponsored by the Holy See in order to explore how the Catholic Church can provide better pastoral care for women forced into prostitution. She won the International Women of Courage Award in 2007 and the European Citizens' Prize in 2013.

In December 2012 she founded the association Slaves No More (Mai più schiave).

Pope Francis chose her to write the texts for the Good Friday Stations of the Cross at the Colosseum in 2019.

References

Additional sources

External links
 Associazione: Slaves No More 

Child crime victim advocates
Child prostitution
21st-century Italian Roman Catholic religious sisters and nuns
Italian women's rights activists
Living people
Prostitution in Europe
Sex industry in Italy
Sexual abuse victim advocates
Year of birth missing (living people)